Elizabeth of Celje  (1441 – 1455), also Elizabeth of Cilli, was the first wife of Matthias Corvinus, the future King of Hungary.

Family background
Elizabeth was born to Ulrich II, Count of Celje and his wife Catherine Branković, daughter of the Serb despot George Branković. Her father was a Prince of the Holy Roman Empire, with extensive domains in both the Empire and in the Kingdom of Hungary, centered in Lower Styria, Carniola, and Slavonia. Her mother was the sister of Mara Branković, a favorite wife of the Ottoman sultan Murad II.

Elizabeth was most likely born in Celje, the family seat. She seems to have had a twin sister, called Catherine, who died as a child. Elizabeth was baptised in the Eastern Orthodox faith of her mother, an arrangement that aroused consternation in the Roman Catholic milieu of Celje.

Both of her brothers, Hermann IV and George, died by 1452. Thereafter she remained her parents' sole child, and the last offspring of the House of Celje.

Betrothal
Elizabeth was initially betrothed to John of Gorizia, son of count Henry IV of Gorizia, who was living in Celje under the tutelage of her father. However, it was later decided she would marry into the Hunyadi family.

Elizabeth's father and maternal grandfather were long-time opponents of John Hunyadi, as the houses of Celje and Hunyadi were competing for influence in the Kingdom of Hungary since the early 1440s. In June 1448, the two parties reached an agreement on the division of spheres of interest, sealed by Elizabeth's betrothal to Ladislaus, John Hunyadi's firstborn son.

In the autumn of the same year, Hunyadi was defeated by the Ottomans at Kosovo; captured by George Branković during his retreat, he was forced to return several estates to him. With the help of the pope, Hunyadi had the disvantageous agreement dissolved; as a consequence, the settlement with the Celjes was called off, as well. Under pressure from the estates, protracted negotiations ensued. In August 1451, a settlement was reached in Smederevo. This time, it was agreed that Elizabeth would marry John's second-born son, Matthias. The wedding was set to 6 December 1453, with the stipulation that should the marriage fail to materialize because any fault attributable to Branković, the latter’s castles and other estates in Hungary would be transferred to Hunyadi and his sons.

It was John Hunyadi himself, however, to call off the wedding few months before it was to take place. In the fall of 1453, in fact, Elizabeth's father fell out of favor with king Ladislaus, and Hunyadi took advantage of the situation to dissolve the alliance with the Celjes which limited his autonomy of action in Hungary. By February 1455, however, Ulrich was back in power, and George Branković was instrumental in renewing the alliance between his son-in-law and Hunyadi in order to secure a common front against the Ottoman threat.

Marriage and death 

Following a renewal of the Celje-Hunyadi alliance, Elizabeth was married to Matthias in the spring of 1455, after having converted to Catholicism. By this time, Ulrich of Celje had remained without sons, with his wife approaching forty: Matthias thus became his most likely heir. He was sent to the royal court in Buda where Ulrich now resided as regent, while Elizabeth settled in the Hunyadis' estates; the two young spouses thus served mostly as hostages between their respective families.

In the winter of 1455, Elizabeth fell seriously ill. The famous preacher John Capistran organized public prayers for her recovery. However, she died before the end of the year at the Hunyadi court in Transylvania. With her death, Ulrich of Celje remained childless, and the last link between the Hunyadi and Celje families was cut.

Ancestry

Notes

Sources

 

House of Celje
Hunyadi family
15th-century Hungarian people
15th-century Hungarian women
1441 births
1455 deaths
Slovenian people of Serbian descent